Ficus simplicissima is an Asian species of fig tree in the family Moraceae.  
This species is similar to Ficus triloba and synonyms include Ficus hirta; its native range is Nepal to southern China and Indo-China, Sumatra and Java.

References

External links 
 

simplicissima
Trees of Vietnam
Flora of Indo-China
Flora of Malesia